Rhona K. M. Smith is a British legal academic. She is professor of international human rights and former head of Newcastle Law School at Newcastle University and is the United Nations special rapporteur for Cambodia.

Smith was criticised by the Cambodian government for behaving like a "teacher in a classroom". Smith had questioned the 2018 elections where Cambodian People’s Party had taken all 125 seats. She noted that 118 politicians had been arrested and the courts had dissolved an opposition party ignoring the constitution which expected a multi-party state. In March 2021, Smith joined three other UN special rapporteurs in criticising lengthy jail terms given to Cambodian opposition leaders living in exile for seeking to return to Cambodia and foment popular opposition to the continued rule of Prime Minister Hun Sen.

Smith served two three-year terms as special rapporteur for Cambodia, completing her service in March 2021, at which time she was succeeded in that office by Thai scholar Vitit Muntarbhorn.

Selected publications

References

Year of birth missing (living people)
Living people
Academics of Newcastle University
British women academics
British legal scholars